The barbel chub (Squaliobarbus curriculus) is a species of cyprinid fish found in China, North Korea, South Korea, eastern Russia, and Vietnam.  It is the only member of its genus.

References 
 

Squaliobarbinae
Cyprinid fish of Asia
Fish of Russia
Freshwater fish of China
Fish described in 1846